Durnovsky is a rural locality (a khutor) in Staroanninskoye Rural Settlement, Novoanninsky District, Volgograd Oblast, Russia. The population was 432 as of 2010. There are 5 streets.

Geography 
Durnovsky is located in forest steppe on the Khopyorsko-Buzulukskaya Plain, on the left bank of the Buzuluk River, 24 km southwest of Novoanninsky (the district's administrative centre) by road. Tavolzhansky is the nearest rural locality.

References 

Rural localities in Novoanninsky District